This is a list of all male winners in FIS Alpine Ski World Cup from 1967 to present. 

The list includes all downhill, super-G, giant slalom, slalom, combined, parallel slalom and parallel giant slalom, but does not show team events.

History
In 57 World Cup seasons 1892 races (524 downhills, 238 super-G's, 447 giant slaloms, 528 slaloms, 134 combined, 2 parallel slaloms, 10 city events, 8 parallel giant slaloms and 1 K.O. slalom) for men were held. These events saw 1904 winners, because twelve races (five downhills, four super-G's, one giant slalom, and two slaloms) ended with a tie.

A total of 304 male alpine skiers from 20 nations have won at least one individual race. The first winner in 1967 was the Austrian Heinrich Messner who won the slalom in Berchtesgaden. The newest member in this list is Norwegian Alexander Steen Olsen who won the slalom in Palisades Tahoe, United States on 26 February 2023. Alpine skiers from twenty nations from three continents have won races; Yugoslavia and Slovenia are listed separately, but counted as one nation; also Germany and West Germany are shown but counted together. The first winner for his country is highlighted in blue.

Jean-Claude Killy was the first skier to win races in two seasons (1967 and 1967/1968), while Ingemar Stenmark won races in 13 seasons and set a record for the greatest absolute number of races won in a single season winning 13 races (out of 33 total) in the 1978–79 season. He won races between 1974/1975 and 1988/1989, only failing to win in the seasons 1984/1985 and 1987/1988. Marc Girardelli, Benjamin Raich, and Aksel Lund Svindal all won races in twelve seasons. Stenmark was also able to win races in ten consecutive seasons (1974/1975 to 1983/1984). Alberto Tomba bettered this mark, when he won races in eleven consecutive seasons (1987/1988 to 1997/1998), and he is still the only skier to do so. Marcel Hirscher (2009/2010 to 2018/2019), Alexis Pinturault (2011/2012 to 2020/2021), and Dominik Paris (2012/2013 to 2021/2022) won races in ten consecutive seasons. Pirmin Zurbriggen (1981/1982 to 1989/1990), Michael Walchhofer (2002/2003 to 2010/2011), Aksel Lund Svindal (2005/2006 to 2013/2014), Ted Ligety (2007/2008 to 2015/2016), and Henrik Kristoffersen (2013/2014 to 2021/2022) all won races in nine consecutive seasons.

Patrick Russel was the first to win races in three and four seasons, Henri Duvillard was the first to win races in five seasons. Gustav Thöni was the first to win races in six, seven, and eight seasons. Ingemar Stenmark was the first to win races in nine, ten, eleven, and twelve seasons and he is the only skier to win races in 13 seasons.

Jean-Claude Killy won all his 18 races in only two seasons, achieving the unmatched feat of winning 12/17, or ~71% of races in a single season (1967), while Günther Mader won his 14 races in nine seasons. Paul Accola was only able to win races in one season (1991/1992), but won seven events in four disciplines. Rok Petrovič also won races only in one season (1985/1986) when he won five slaloms. Michael von Grünigen is the highest placed racer to win in only one discipline – 23 giant slaloms.

104 racers have won only one race. The downhill races saw 120 different winners (the 100th different winner was Canada's Manuel Osborne-Paradis in 2009), the super-G races saw 82 different winners, the giant slaloms 103 different (the 100th different winner was Norway's Lucas Braathen in 2020), the slaloms 118 different (the 100th different winner was Italy's Cristian Deville in 2012), combined events 40 different winners, parallel slalom events saw ten different winners and parallel giant slalom events saw seven different winners.

The youngest male winner is Piero Gros (born 30 October 1954) who won the giant slalom in Val-d'Isère on 8 December 1972 at the age of 18 years and 39 days. The oldest winner is Didier Cuche (born 16 August 1974) who was aged 37 years and 192 days when he won the super-G in Crans-Montana on 24 February 2012. The oldest skier to win his first race was Dave Ryding (born 5 December 1986) when he won the slalom in Kitzbühel on 22 January 2022, he was aged 35 years and 48 days.

The highest bib number with 66 to win a race was worn by Markus Foser in the downhill of Val Gardena on 17 December 1993. Only five days later the highest bib number to win a super-G was 51 used by Hannes Trinkl in Lech am Arlberg on 22 December 1993. In giant slalom the highest bib number 45 to win belonged to the youngest winner ever Piero Gros on 8 December 1972 in Val-d'Isère. The record holder for the highest bib number in slalom is Ivica Kostelić, who won in Aspen, Colorado with 64. Niels Hintermann won the Alpine combined in Wengen on 17 January 2017 with bib number 51. The third highest bib number overall to win a race was 61 worn by Josef Strobl on 16 December 1994 in the downhill in Val-d'Isère.

Disciplines were introduced in World Cup: downhill, giant slalom and slalom in 1967; Combined and parallel slalom in 1975; super-G in 1982, super-combined in 2006 and renamed to alpine combined in 2015. 
Five skiers have won races in all five main disciplines: Marc Girardelli, Pirmin Zurbriggen, Bode Miller, Kjetil André Aamodt and Günther Mader. An additional two skiers, Frenchmen Jean-Claude Killy and Henri Duvillard, have won races in all three disciplines contested during their careers (super-G was first introduced as a part of the giant slalom discipline in 1983 and was only established as a separate discipline in 1986, well after the 1968 and 1973 retirements of Killy and Duvillard, respectively).

Winners

Milestones
 First to win 10 races in one event: Jean-Noël Augert (slalom)
 First to win 20 races in one event: Franz Klammer (downhill)
 First to win 30 races in one event: Ingemar Stenmark (giant slalom)
 First to win 40 races in one event: Ingemar Stenmark (giant slalom)

 First to win 10 races in two events: Ingemar Stenmark (giant slalom and slalom)
 First to win 20 races in two events: Ingemar Stenmark (giant slalom and slalom)
 First to win 30 races in two events: Ingemar Stenmark (giant slalom and slalom)
 First to win 40 races in two events: Ingemar Stenmark (giant slalom and slalom)

 First to win races in three events: Jean-Claude Killy (giant slalom, downhill and slalom)
 First to win races in four events: Gustav Thöni (giant slalom, slalom, parallel slalom and combined)
 First to win races in five events: Pirmin Zurbriggen (downhill, super-G, giant slalom, slalom and combined)
 First to win ten races in three events: Pirmin Zurbriggen (downhill, super-G, and combined)
 First to win five races in four events: Pirmin Zurbriggen (downhill, super-G, giant slalom, and combined)
 First to win five races in all five events: Bode Miller

 NA - Disciplines didn't exist yet
 Seasons are shown in which the racer won
 Ties are shown in chronological order

Statistics

See also
List of FIS Alpine Ski World Cup women's race winners

References

External links
FIS-ski.com – official results for FIS alpine World Cup events

Men's race winners
World Cup men's race winners
Lists of skiers
Lists of male skiers
FIS